Larviform female is a biological phenomenon occurring in some insect species, where the females in the adult stage of metamorphosis resemble the larvae to various degrees, while the male appears more morphologically adult (as imagoes). The resemblance may mean the larviform female has the same coloring as the larvae and/or similar body plans, and may be the result of the female arresting development at earlier stages of ecdysis than males. The female may not pupate at all, as in Xenos vesparum. Typically, the female is wingless and generally larger than the male. Larviform females still reach sexual maturity. Larviform females occur in several insect groups, including most Strepsiptera and Bagworm moths, many elateroid beetles (e.g., Lampyridae), and some gall midges.

Larviform females are an area of interest in the study of the  evolution of insect metamorphosis. 

Since these females have lower ability to disperse, this may help explain high endemism in some groups, such as Lampyridae fireflies.

See Also
Paedogenesis

References

See also
 Lampyridae
 Phengodidae
 Rhagophthalmidae
 Thylodrias contractus
 Hypermetamorphosis
Neoteny

Insect morphology
Evolutionary developmental biology